

Gmina Pruszcz Gdański is a rural gmina (administrative district) in Gdańsk County, Pomeranian Voivodeship, in northern Poland. Its seat is the town of Pruszcz Gdański, although the town is not part of the territory of the gmina.

Villages
Gmina Pruszcz Gdański contains the villages and settlements of Arciszewo, Będzieszyn, Bogatka, Borkowo Łostowickie, Borzęcin, Bystra, Bystra-Osiedle, Cieplewo, Dziewięć Włók, Głębokie, Goszyn, Jagatowo, Juszkowo, Krępiec, Lędowo, Łęgowo, Malentyn, Mokry Dwór, Ostatni Grosz, Przejazdowo, Radunica, Rekcin, Rokitnica, Roszkowo, Rotmanka, Rusocin, Straszyn, Świńcz, Weselno, Wiślina, Wiślinka, Wojanowo, Żukczyn, Żuława and Żuławka.

Neighbouring gminas
Gmina Pruszcz Gdański is bordered by the towns of Gdańsk and Pruszcz Gdański, and by the gminas of Cedry Wielkie, Kolbudy, Pszczółki, Suchy Dąb and Trąbki Wielkie.

References
 Polish official population figures 2006

Pruszcz Gdanski
Gdańsk County